The women's 800 metres middle distance event at the 1960 Olympic Games took place between September 6 and September 7.  This was the return of the event for the first time since 1928.

Dixie Willis had the best time in qualifying, thus the Olympic record though Lyudmila Shevtsova had set the world record a month earlier in Moscow.  In the final Willis took the race out, marked by Shevtsova.  By the final straightaway, Brenda Jones was also with Shevtsova and looking fast challenging Willis for the lead.  Suddenly Willis stepped on the curb and fell off the track into the infield.  Shevtsova edged into the lead and dipped at the finish to equal her own world record and take the gold in 2:04.3.  Jones was electronically timed at being .08 behind though electronic timing would not become official for another 17 years.  Ursula Donath was the lucky (somewhat unified) German who was a step behind the top three when Willis exited to get the bronze.  Less than two years later, Wilis would improve the world record by three seconds.

Results

Heats

The top two runners in each of the four heats (blue) and the next fastest one (pink) advanced to the final round.

Heat 1

Heat 2

Heat 3

Heat 4

Final

Key: WR = world record; OR = Olympic record; DNF = did not finish; DQ = disqualified

References

Athletics at the 1960 Summer Olympics
800 metres at the Olympics
1960 in women's athletics
Women's events at the 1960 Summer Olympics